The 1959 Soviet football championship was the 27th seasons of competitive football in the Soviet Union and the 21st among teams of sports societies and factories. Dinamo Moscow won the championship becoming the Soviet domestic champions for the ninth time.

Honours

Notes = Number in parentheses is the times that club has won that honour. * indicates new record for competition

Soviet Union football championship

Class A

Class B

Group 1

Group 2

Group 3

Group 4

Group 5

Play-Off for 1st place
 [in Rostov-na-Donu]
 Admiralteyets Leningrad  4-1 Volga Kalinin

Group 6

Group 7
 [All teams are from Russian Federation]

Play-Off for 1st place
 [in Rostov-na-Donu]
 SKVO Sverdlovsk  4-1 Lokomotiv Krasnoyarsk

Final (Russian Federation)
 [Nov 6-10, Grozny]

Top goalscorers

Class A
Zaur Kaloyev (Dinamo Tbilisi) – 16 goals

References

External links
 1959 Soviet football championship. RSSSF